The mixed doubles SL3–SU5 tournament at the 2020 Summer Paralympics in Tokyo took place between 1 and 5 September 2021 at Yoyogi National Gymnasium.

Seeds
These were the seeds for this event:
 (gold medalists)
 (silver medalists)

Group stage 
The draw of the group stage revealed on 26 August 2021. The group stage was played from 1 to 3 September. The top two winners of each group advanced to the knockout rounds.

Group A

Group B

Finals 
The knockout stage was played from 4 to 5 September.

References 

Badminton at the 2020 Summer Paralympics